Lafleur Restaurants (in French, Resto Lafleur) is a chain of family-owned fast food restaurants located in the greater Montreal area.

History 
The business began in 1951 on Avenue Lafleur in LaSalle, Quebec (in the Montreal area).  It was set up by Denis Vinet who had spent the previous ten years selling hot dogs and french fries from a van in LaSalle. The business gradually grew into a Montreal-wide chain.

Fare
Lafleur is widely known for serving for its hot dogs, hamburgers, french fries and poutine. It is particularly known for its hot dog dishes.

See also
 List of Canadian restaurant chains
 La Belle Province (restaurant)
 Dic Ann's Hamburgers
 Valentine (restaurant)

References

External links 
 

1961 establishments in Quebec
Fast-food chains of Canada
Hot dog restaurants
Montreal cuisine
Regional restaurant chains in Canada
Restaurant chains in Canada
Restaurants established in 1961
Restaurants in Montreal
Companies based in Longueuil